Leo the Philosopher may refer to:

Leo the Mathematician (c. 790–after 869), Byzantine philosopher
Leo VI the Wise (866–912), Byzantine emperorer